Gotapara Union is a Union parishad under Bagerhat Sadar Upazila of Bagerhat District in the division of Khulna, Bangladesh. It has an area of 30.72 km² (11.86 sq mi) and a population of 26,605.

Villages
Gopalakathi
 Kananpur
Kaldia
Keshbpur
Alukdia
Vatchala
Baniagati
Gotapara
Mukkhait
Paschimvag
Kandapara
Depara
Ataikathi
Paranwapara
Nawapara
 Patilakhali
Betkhali
Nataikhali
Gabarkhali
 Gaokhali

References

Unions of Bagerhat Sadar Upazila
Unions of Bagerhat District
Unions of Khulna Division